Van de Weyer or Vandeweyer is a surname. Notable people with the surname include:

André Vandeweyer (1909–1992), Belgian footballer and manager
Sylvain Van de Weyer (1802–1874), Belgian politician and diplomat
William John Bates van de Weyer (1870–1946), British Army officer and botanist

See also 
Mark Vendeweyer (born 1972), Belgian sprint canoeist
Weyer

Surnames of Dutch origin